"Faderen" (The Father) is a short story published in 1860 by the Norwegian writer Bjørnstjerne Bjørnson in his collection Smaastykker (Small Pieces). It is one of his peasant stories. 

The theme is related to the lidelsens høgskole 'college of suffering', a concept that Bjørnson developed when he read texts by the German preacher Ludwig Hofacker in the summer of 1859. The protagonist Thord Øveraas goes from prosperity and pride through deep despair to humility.

Plot
Thord Øveraas is a rich and prosperous farmer, one of the most powerful men in his community. One day he stands in the priest's office and says he wants his son baptized. The baptism is scheduled for the coming Saturday at twelve o'clock. Sixteen years later, Thord comes to the priest's living room, and asks to have his son confirmed. He will not pay the priest until he makes sure that his son is first in line. Then eight years go by and Thord stands in the priest's office with several other men from the village. The son is to marry Karen Storlien, the village's richest girl. He pays three dollars, although the priest says he should receive only one. All these times Thord has talked to the priest, he has always asked "Is there anything else?", and every time Thord replies "Otherwise there is nothing."

Fourteen days later, the unthinkable happens to Thord. One day they are out rowing and talking about the wedding, and then the son falls out of the boat, goes stiff, and drowns. The father looks for three days and three nights for his dead son. On the morning of the third day, he finds his son's body and carries him up the slopes back to his farm.

An entire year passes. One autumn evening, the priest hears someone walking outside the front room, and there stands Thord. He says he has sold his farm and wants to donate half the money for a grant in his son's name. The priest says "Now I think your son has finally blessed you." "Yes, now I think so too," replies Thord.

References

External links
1860 edition of Faderen at the National Library of Norway
1860 edition of Faderen at Project Runeberg

Norwegian literature
1860 short stories